Karnaq (also known as Karneh and Kizmya) is a village in Khvoresh Rostam-e Jonubi Rural District, Khvoresh Rostam District, Khalkhal County, Ardabil Province, Iran. At the 2006 census, its population was 216, in 38 families.

References 

Tageo

Towns and villages in Khalkhal County